Erotikon is a 1920 Swedish romantic comedy film directed by Mauritz Stiller, starring Tora Teje, Karin Molander, Anders de Wahl and Lars Hanson. It is based on the 1917 play A kék róka by Ferenc Herczeg. The story revolves around an entomology professor obsessed with the sexual life of bugs, and his easygoing wife who is courted by two suitors.

Plot
Leo Charpentier, entomology professor, is interested in polygamy among beetles but hasn't noticed that his wife Irene is having an affair with his best friend, sculptor Preben Wells, and flirting with an aviator, Baron Felix. They go to a ballet – Schaname, about the shah's wife who tries to seduce his best friend: he demurs but the shah kills him anyway. Leo says he'd have preferred a happy ending. In a shop, Irene hears a woman charging a fur to Preben and walks out, jealous. Preben sees Felix taking a woman home, and thinks it's Irene, and is also jealous. He goes to Irene's home and accuses her; she tells Leo she's deceived him, and walks out. Preben finds Felix's friend wasn't Irene at all. To atone for his mistake, he tries to return Irene to Leo – but when he finds her, and explains that the woman buying the fur was his model, it's they who make up. Irene phones Leo to point out that his niece Marte loves him and will cook the meals for him she never did herself.

Cast
 Anders de Wahl as Leo Charpentier
 Tora Teje as Irene
 Karin Molander as Marthe
 Elin Lagergren as Irene's mother
 Lars Hanson as Preben Wells
 Vilhelm Bryde as baron Felix
 Bell Hedqvist as the baron's female friend
 Torsten Hammarén as Sidonius
 Vilhelm Berndtson as Jean

The extensive ballet scene in the film was choreographed by Carina Ari, noted Swedish dancer. The dance was performed by the Royal Swedish Ballet and music was written by Kurt Atterberg.

Release
The film premiered in Sweden on 8 November 1920. It became a commercial success and was sold to 45 markets abroad.

References

External links
 
 

1920 films
1920 romantic comedy films
Swedish silent feature films
Swedish films based on plays
Films based on works by Ferenc Herczeg
Films directed by Mauritz Stiller
Swedish black-and-white films
Swedish romantic comedy films
Silent romantic comedy films
1920s Swedish films